Hate, Fear and Power is the second studio album by American thrash metal band Hirax, released in August 1986. The band considers this a full-length album despite the short length.

Track listing

Personnel
Katon W. DePena (Bobby Johnson) - vocals
Scott Owen - guitars
Gary Monardo - bass
Eric Brecht - drums

Production
Bill Metoyer - engineering
Tom G. Warrior - logo
"Mad" Marc Rude - cover art

References 

1986 albums
Hirax albums
Metal Blade Records albums